Brachypylina is a suborder of oribatid mites.

Families

 Pycnonoticae Grandjean, 1954
 Hermannielloidea Grandjean, 1934
 Hermanniellidae Grandjean, 1934
 Plasmobatidae Grandjean, 1961
 Neoliodoidea Sellnick, 1928
 Neoliodidae Sellnick, 1928
 Plateremaeoidea Trägårdh, 1926
 Plateremaeidae Trägårdh, 1926
 Pheroliodidae Paschoal, 1987
 Licnodamaeidae Grandjean, 1954
 Licnobelbidae Grandjean, 1965
 Gymnodamaeoidea Grandjean, 1954
 Gymnodamaeidae Grandjean, 1954
 Aleurodamaeidae Paschoal & Johnston, 1985
 Damaeoidea Berlese, 1896
 Damaeidae Berlese, 1896
 Polypterozetoidea Grandjean, 1959
 Polypterozetidae Grandjean, 1959
 Podopterotegaeidae Piffl, 1972
 Cepheoidea Berlese, 1896
 Cepheidae Berlese, 1896
 Niphocepheidae Travé, 1959
 Cerocepheidae Subías, 2004
 Eutegaeidae Balogh, 1965
 Pterobatidae Balogh & Mahunka, 1977
 Nodocepheidae Piffl, 1972
 Tumerozetidae Hammer, 1966
 Charassobatoidea Grandjean, 1958
 Microtegeidae Balogh, 1972
 Charassobatidae Grandjean, 1958
 Nosybeidae Mahunka, 1993
 Microzetoidea Grandjean, 1936
 Microzetidae Grandjean, 1936
 Zetorchestoidea Michael, 1898
 Zetorchestidae Michael, 1898
 Gustavioidea Oudemans, 1900
 Astegistidae Balogh, 1961
 Multoribulidae Balogh, 1972
 Ceratoppiidae Kunst, 1971
 Metrioppiidae Balogh, 1943
 Gustaviidae Oudemans, 1900
 Liacaridae Sellnick, 1928
 Xenillidae Woolley & Higgins, 1966
 Tenuialidae Jacot, 1929
 Eremaeoidea Oudemans, 1900
 Kodiakellidae Hammer, 1967
 Megeremaeidae Woolley e Higgins, 1968
 Eremaeidae Oudemans, 1900
 Aribatidae Aoki, Takaku e Ito, 1994
 Amerobelboidea Grandjean, 1954
 Ctenobelbidae Grandjean, 1965
 Amerobelbidae Grandjean, 1954
 Eremulidae Grandjean, 1965
 Damaeolidae Grandjean, 1965
 Hungarobelbidae Miko & Travé, 1996
 Eremobelbidae Balogh, 1961
 Heterobelbidae Balogh, 1961
 Basilobelbidae Balogh, 1961
 Ameridae Bulanova-Zachvatkina, 1957
 Staurobatidae Grandjean, 1966
 Eremelloidea Balogh, 1961
 Platyameridae J. & P. Balogh, 1983
 Caleremaeidae Grandjean, 1965
 Eremellidae Balogh, 1961
 Machadobelbidae Balogh, 1972
 Oribellidae Kunst, 1971
 Arceremaeidae Balogh, 1972
 Spinozetidae Balogh, 1972
 Oppioidea Sellnick, 1937
 Autognetidae Grandjean, 1960
 Thyrisomidae Grandjean, 1953
 Oppiidae Sellnick, 1937
 Epimerellidae Ayyildiz & Luxton, 1989
 Lyroppiidae Balogh, 1983
 Granuloppiidae Balogh, 1983
 Teratoppiidae Balogh, 1983
 Sternoppiidae Balogh & Mahunka, 1969
 Machuellidae Balogh, 1983
 Papillonotidae Balogh, 1983
 Tuparezetidae Balogh, 1972
 Quadroppiidae Balogh, 1983
 Trizetoidea Ewing, 1917
 Nosybelbidae Mahunka, 1994
 Cuneoppiidae Balogh, 1983
 Suctobelbidae Jacot, 1938
 Rhynchoribatidae Balogh, 1961
 Oxyameridae Aoki, 1965
 Trizetidae Ewing, 1917
 Otocepheoidea Balogh, 1961
 Dampfiellidae Balogh, 1961
 Tetracondylidae Aoki, 1961
 Otocepheidae Balogh, 1961
 Tokunocepheidae Aoki, 1966
 Carabodoidea Koch, 1837
 Carabodidae Koch, 1837
 Carabocepheidae Mahunka, 1986
 Nippobodidae Aoki, 1959
 Tectocepheoidea Grandjean, 1954
 Tectocepheidae Grandjean, 1954
 Tegeocranellidae P. Balogh, 1987
 Hydrozetoidea Grandjean, 1954
 Hydrozetidae Grandjean, 1954
 Ameronothroidea Willmann, 1931
 Ameronothridae Willmann, 1931
 Selenoribatidae Schuster, 1963
 Fortuyniidae Hammen, 1963
 Cymbaeremaeoidea Sellnick, 1928
 Adhaesozetidae Hammer, 1973
 Cymbaeremaeidae Sellnick, 1928
 Ametroproctidae Subías, 2004

 Poronoticae Grandjean, 1954
 Licneremaeoidea Grandjean, 1931
 Dendroeremaeidae Behan-Pelletier, Eamer & Clayton, 2005
 Micreremidae Grandjean, 1954
 Lamellareidae Balogh, 1972
 Licneremaeidae Grandjean, 1931
 Scutoverticidae Grandjean, 1954
 Passalozetidae Grandjean, 1954
 Phenopelopoidea Petrunkevitch, 1955
 Phenopelopidae Petrunkevitch, 1955
 Unduloribatoidea Kunst, 1971
 Unduloribatidae Kunst, 1971
 Eremaeozetidae Piffl, 1972
 Idiozetidae Aoki, 1976
 Limnozetoidea Thor, 1937
 Limnozetidae Thor, 1937
 Austrachipteriidae Luxton, 1985
 Achipterioidea Thor, 1929
 Achipteriidae Thor, 1929
 Tegoribatidae Grandjean, 1954
 Oribatelloidea Jacot, 1925
 Oribatellidae Jacot, 1925
 Ceratokalummidae Balogh, 1970
 Epactozetidae Grandjean, 1930
 Ceratozetoidea Jacot, 1925
 Heterozetidae Kunst, 1971
 Ceratozetidae Jacot, 1925
 Chamobatidae Thor, 1937
 Humerobatidae Grandjean, 1970
 Punctoribatidae Thor, 1937
 Zetomotrichoidea Grandjean, 1934
 Zetomotrichidae Grandjean, 1934
 Oripodoidea Jacot, 1925
 Drymobatidae J. & P. Balogh, 1984
 Mochlozetidae Grandjean, 1960
 Neotrichozetidae Balogh, 1965
 Oribatulidae Thor, 1929
 Nesozetidae J. & P. Balogh, 1984
 Pseudoppiidae Mahunka, 1975
 Parapirnodidae Aoki & Ohkubo, 1974
 Caloppiidae Balogh, 1960
 Hemileiidae J. & P. Balogh, 1984
 Maudheimiidae J. & P. Balogh, 1984
 Liebstadiidae J. & P. Balogh, 1984
 Symbioribatidae Aoki, 1966
 Scheloribatidae Jacot, 1935
 Oripodidae Jacot, 1925
 Pirnodidae Grandjean, 1956
 Protoribatidae J. & P. Balogh, 1984
 Haplozetidae Grandjean, 1936
 Nasobatidae Balogh, 1972
 Tubulozetidae P. Balogh, 1989
 Galumnoidea Jacot, 1925
 Parakalummidae Grandjean, 1936
 Galumnidae Jacot, 1925
 Galumnellidae Piffl, 1970

References
 Subías, Luis S. (2007): Listado sistemático, sinonímico y biogeográfico de los ácaros oribátidos (Acariformes: Oribatida) del mundo (Excepto fósiles). PDF — most up to date catalogue available

Sarcoptiformes
Arthropod suborders